Motherland is a 2015 Turkish drama by director Senem Tüzen about a divorced, urban woman who goes to her ancestral village in Anatolia to write a book and is confronted by the unwelcomed arrival of her mother. The drama stars Esra Bezen Bilgin, Nihal Koldaş, Fatma Kısa and Semih Aydın.

Tüzen's debut feature premiered at the 72nd Venice International Film Festival in the International Film Critics' Week section in September, 2015.

Plot 
Nesrin is an urban, upper–middle class woman recovering from a divorce. She’s quit her office job, abandoned her house in Istanbul, and come to the village house of her deceased grandmother to finish a novel and live out her childhood dream of being a writer. When her conservative and increasingly unhinged mother turns up uninvited and refuses to leave, Nesrin’s writing stalls and her fantasies of village life turn bitter as the two are forced to confront the darker corners of each other’s inner worlds.

Accolades

References

External links
 
 

Films set in Turkey
2010s Turkish-language films
2015 films
Films shot in Turkey
Turkish drama films
2015 drama films